The 2012 season of the Esiliiga, the second level in the Estonian football system, is the twenty-third season in the league's history. The season officially began on 11 March 2012 and concluded on 4 November 2013. The previous league champions Tallinna Kalev were promoted to the Meistriliiga while Legion and Warrior were relegated to the II Liiga. For this season those three teams were replaced by Rakvere Tarvas from II liiga East/North division and Tartu SK 10 and Tammeka II from II liiga West/South division.

Teams

Stadiums and locations

Personnel and kits 
Note: Flags indicate national team as has been defined under FIFA eligibility rules. Players and Managers may hold more than one non-FIFA nationality.

League table

Promotion play-off 
At season's end, the runners-up of the 2013 Esiliiga will participate in a two-legged play-off with the ninth place club of the 2013 Meistriliiga for the spot in next year's competition.

Relegation play-off

Season statistics

Top scorers

Awards

Monthly awards

Esiliiga Player of the Year
Manucho was named Esiliiga Player of the Year.

See also 
 2012 Meistriliiga
 2011–12 Estonian Cup
 2012–13 Estonian Cup

References 

Esiliiga seasons
2
Estonia
Estonia